Torna Fort, also known as Prachandagad, is a large fort located in Pune district, in the Indian state of Maharashtra. It is historically significant because it was the first fort captured by Chhatrapati Shivaji in 1646, at the age of 16. The name derives from Prachanda (Marathi for huge or massive) and gad (Marathi for fort).

History

This fort is believed to have been constructed by the Shiva Panth in the 13th century. A Menghai Devi temple, also referred to as the Tornaji temple, is situated near the entrance of the fort. Malik Ahmed, a Bahamani ruler, captured this fort during the reign of Alauddin Khilji during the late 1470s.

In 1646, Shivaji captured this fort at the age of sixteen , thus making it one of the first forts that would become one of the forts of the Maratha empire. 
Shivaji renamed the fort ' 'Prachandagad' ' as Torna, and constructed several monuments and towers within it.

In the 18th century, the Mughal empire briefly gained control of this fort after the assassination of Shivaji's son Sambhaji raje. Aurangzeb, the then Mughal emperor, renamed this fort Futulgaib in recognition of the difficult defense the Mughals had to overcome to capture this fort. It was restored to the Maratha confederacy by the Treaty of Purandar.

Location
The fort is about 50 km via Pabe ghat southwest of Pune in the Western Ghats of the Sahyadri mountain ranges at the base village Velhe. One can go from Pune via Satara road and take right at Nasarapur village. This distance is near about 65 km. It is the highest fort in Pune district.

Tourism
The Torna Fort is a popular destination for trekkers specially after the south-west monsoon, from September to December. Staying at fort isn't allowed as per orders of District Collector, everyone is asked to leave the fort after 5:00pm. The Raigad, Lingana, Rajgad, Purandar fort, Sinhagad are seen from Torna.

Gallery

References

Forts in Pune district